The UK Singles Chart is the official record chart in the United Kingdom. Record charts in the UK began life in 1952 when Percy Dickins from New Musical Express (NME) imitated an idea started in American Billboard magazine and began compiling a hit parade. Prior to this, a song's popularity was measured by the sales of sheet music. Initially, Dickins telephoned a sample of around 20 shops asking for a list of the 10 best-selling songs. These results were then aggregated to give a Top 12 chart published in NME on 14 November 1952. The number-one single was "Here in My Heart" by Al Martino.

According to The Official Charts Company and Guinness' British Hit Singles & Albums, the NME is considered the official British singles chart before 10 March 1960. However, until 15 February 1969, when the British Market Research Bureau chart was established, there was no universally accepted chart. Other charts existed and different artists may have placed at number one in charts by Record Mirror, Disc or Melody Maker. Alternatively, some considered BBC's Pick of the Pops, which averaged all these charts, to be a better indicator of the number-one single.

In terms of number-one singles, Frankie Laine, Guy Mitchell and Elvis Presley were the most successful artists of the 1950s having four singles reach the top spot. The longest duration of a single at number one was eighteen weeks achieved by Frankie Laine's "I Believe". , "I Believe" still holds the record for the most (non-consecutive) weeks at the top of the UK Singles Chart. Although official music recording sales certifications were not introduced until the British Phonographic Industry was formed in 1973, Disc introduced an initiative in 1959 to present a gold disc to records that sold over one million units. Prior to that it is believed that the three best-selling records of the decade—Bill Haley & His Comets' "Rock Around the Clock", Paul Anka's "Diana" and Harry Belafonte's "Mary's Boy Child"—all sold over one million copies.

Number-one singles

By artist
The following artists achieved three or more number-one hits during the 1950s. Artists Frankie Laine, Guy Mitchell and Elvis Presley were the most successful acts of the decade in terms of number-one singles, each having four singles reach the top of the chart. In total, Laine spent 32 weeks occupying the top of chart in the 1950s; the next highest was Presley who spent a total of 18 weeks at number one.

By record label

The following record labels had five or more number ones on the UK Singles Chart during the 1950s.

Notes

References
Footnotes

Sources

External links

1950s in British music
1950s